Boneh Var-e Yaqub (also Romanized as Boneh Vār-e Ya‘qūb and Bonvār-e Ya‘qūb) is a village in Zaz-e Gharbi Rural District, Zaz va Mahru District, Aligudarz County, Lorestan Province, Iran. At the 2006 census, its population was 70, in 15 families.

References 

Towns and villages in Aligudarz County